Henry John Atkinson, later Henry John Farmer-Atkinson JP, MP, (1828 – 1913) was an English Conservative Party politician and shipowner.

Atkinson was Mayor of Hull twice, in 1864 and 1865. He was elected Member of Parliament (MP) for North Lincolnshire at a by-election in July 1885.  That constituency was abolished under the Redistribution of Seats Act 1885, and at the 1885 general election he stood in the new Brigg division of Lincolnshire, but lost to his Liberal opponent, taking only 35% of the votes.  At the 1886 general election he stood in Boston, winning the seat by a narrow majority of 48 votes (2%) from the sitting Liberal MP William Ingram. He did not defend the seat, when it was regained by Ingram.   He stood as independent candidate at the August 1892 by-election in Derby, but won only 20% of the votes.

He was the founder and first president of The Chamber of Shipping of the United Kingdom.

He married firstly in 1854 Elizabeth Holmes and secondly in 1869 Elizabeth Farmer, the daughter of a former mayor of Hull.   In 1891 he assumed the name of Farmer-Atkinson. Farmer-Atkinson died at his home, Woodcote Place near Epsom, Surrey, on 3 March 1913.

References

External links 
 

Atkinson
1913 deaths
Atkinson
Atkinson
Conservative Party (UK) MPs for English constituencies
Mayors of Kingston upon Hull